Tine Zwaan (born 17 June 1947) is a Dutch former professional tennis player.

Biography
Zwaan, a 1970 Universiade doubles gold medalist, competed on the professional tour in the 1970s and represented the Netherlands in a total of nine Federation Cup ties.

In 1973, Zwaan earned a place in the end of year Virginia Slims Championships.

Her best performance at grand slam level came at the 1974 Wimbledon Championships, where she made the third round of both the singles and mixed doubles.

During her Federation Cup career she featured mostly as a doubles player and partnered with Betty Stöve to win over Denmark in the deciding doubles rubber of a World Group quarter-final in 1976, setting up a semi-final against the United States. The Dutch were beaten in all rubbers by the Americans in the semi-finals, with Zwaan featuring in doubles.

See also
List of Netherlands Fed Cup team representatives

References

External links
 
 
 

1947 births
Living people
Dutch female tennis players
Universiade medalists in tennis
Universiade gold medalists for the Netherlands
Medalists at the 1970 Summer Universiade
20th-century Dutch women
21st-century Dutch women